This list of the oldest buildings and structures lists the oldest buildings still standing in Montreal, Quebec, Canada along with their year of completion.

See also
Architecture of Montreal
List of National Historic Sites of Canada in Montreal

References

Old Montreal buildings
Montreal
Buildings, Oldest